Bradford-on-Tone is a village and civil parish in Wellington, Somerset, England, situated on the River Tone  south west of Taunton in the Somerset West and Taunton district.  The parish, which includes Tone Green and Hele, has a population of 622.

The village is centred on the meeting of three roads: two of these come from the A38, the main road between the towns of Taunton and Wellington, while the third leads north to the nearby village of Oake. Around this junction are situated the local pub, The White Horse, a war memorial, the Church of St Giles, the Village Hall and some older residential buildings.

History

The name Bradford is undoubtedly English: it shows the village to have stood in Saxon days near a broad ford, or passageway across the River Tone. The parish of Bradford was part of the Taunton Deane Hundred. The 14th-century Bradford Bridge over the Tone is said to have been 'built by the monks', though it is not known which particular monks did the work.

In the 1830s the Grand Western Canal was under construction and included a bridge at Trefusis Farm.

On 16 May 1991 Bradford-on-Tone was the site of a major chemical incident when a train carrying kerosene, petrol and diesel was derailed and caught fire. The fire service took two days to put the fire out and there was significant environmental damage. The cause of the accident was an axle failure on one of the tank wagons.

Governance

The parish council has responsibility for local issues, including setting an annual precept (local rate) to cover the council's operating costs and producing annual accounts for public scrutiny. The parish council evaluates local planning applications and works with the local police, district council officers, and neighbourhood watch groups on matters of crime, security, and traffic. The parish council's role also includes initiating projects for the maintenance and repair of parish facilities, as well as consulting with the district council on the maintenance, repair, and improvement of highways, drainage, footpaths, public transport, and street cleaning. Conservation matters (including trees and listed buildings) and environmental issues are also the responsibility of the council.

The village falls within the non-metropolitan district of Somerset West and Taunton, which was established on 1 April 2019. It was previously in the district of Taunton Deane, which was formed on 1 April 1974 under the Local Government Act 1972, and part of Wellington Rural District before that. The district council is responsible for local planning and building control, local roads, council housing, environmental health, markets and fairs, refuse collection and recycling, cemeteries and crematoria, leisure services, parks, and tourism.

Somerset County Council is responsible for running the largest and most expensive local services such as education, social services, libraries, main roads, public transport, policing and fire services, trading standards, waste disposal and strategic planning.

There is also an electoral ward in the same name. The ward however stretches northwards to Oake and west to Langford Budville. The total population of this ward at the 2011 census is 2,337.

It is also part of the Taunton Deane county constituency represented in the House of Commons of the Parliament of the United Kingdom. It elects one Member of Parliament (MP) by the first past the post system of election. It was part of the South West England constituency of the European Parliament prior to Britain leaving the European Union in January 2020, which elected seven MEPs using the d'Hondt method of party-list proportional representation.

Church of St Giles

Bradford church is dedicated to St Giles, but it hasn't been referred to as such until 1754. It is a Grade II* listed building. An old will of 1466 mentions the Church of "Our Lady" of Bradford, and an inscription on one of the bells refers to 'Ave Maria Gratia Plena', suggesting that the earlier dedication was to the Blessed Virgin Mary. The change was likely made some time after the English Reformation. The church was most fortunate in not being stripped of its bells at the Dissolution during Henry VIII's reign.

The church is assumed to stand on the site of a former Saxon wooden church. The general design and character of the current church are 13th century Early English. In 1858–1859, the church was extensively renovated, with one wall strengthened, the pews and the whole roof replaced. The effigy of Sir John de Merriet, Lord of the Manor and Patron of the Church from 1350–1391, shown as a knight in armour, had its elbow cut away to make room for the pews during the renovation.

The church tower has an historic three-trained clock with no dial, dating back to at least 1720. The clock, striking the quarter and full hours, was restored to working order in December 2001, with automatic winding installed. Four of the six bells in the tower are pre-reformation, two of them dated 1450 and another two 1520. The two newer bells are from 1646 and 1811.

An organ was first installed in the church in 1867, but the present organ dates from 1913, having been completely restored in 1951. Additional improvements to the organ were made in 1981. The pulpit, which may have been moved from St Mary Magdalene in Taunton and dates from the early 18th century.

The churchyard contains Commonwealth war graves of two British Army soldiers of World War I and a notable Royal Air Force officer of World War II, Air Vice Marshal John Cole-Hamilton.

Gallery

References

External links

 Village website

Villages in Taunton Deane
Civil parishes in Somerset
Grand Western Canal